Parris John Campbell Jr. (born July 16, 1997) is an American football wide receiver for the New York Giants of the National Football League (NFL). He played college football at Ohio State and was drafted by the Indianapolis Colts in the second round of the 2019 NFL Draft.

Early years
Campbell attended St. Vincent–St. Mary High School in Akron, Ohio. He played wide receiver and running back in high school. As a senior, he ran for 1,584 yards and 22 touchdowns. Campbell also led St. Vincent-St. Mary to win back-to-back state championships (2012 and 2013) his junior and senior year. He committed to Ohio State University to play college football. Campbell also ran track in high school.

College career
After redshirting his first year at Ohio State in 2014, Campbell played in four games as a freshman in 2015, but did not record any receptions. As a sophomore in 2016, he had 13 receptions for 121 yards and added 21 kick returns for 584 yards. As a junior in 2017, Campbell had 40 receptions for 584 yards and three touchdowns. He returned to Ohio State his senior season in 2018.

Professional career

Indianapolis Colts
Campbell was drafted by the Indianapolis Colts in the second round (59th overall) of the 2019 NFL Draft. He caught his first NFL touchdown in Week 2 against the Tennessee Titans on September 15, 2019. He was placed on injured reserve on December 9, 2019 after suffering a broken foot in Week 14. He finished the season with 18 catches for 127 yards and one touchdown through seven games and three starts. He dealt with several injuries throughout his rookie year, including a sports hernia costing him two games and a broken hand causing him to miss four more games.

In Week 1 of 2020, Campbell caught six passes for a career-high 71 yards. In Week 2, he suffered a PCL and MCL injury in his left knee and was placed on injured reserve on September 22, 2020.

On October 19, 2021, Campbell was placed on injured reserve. He was activated off of the list on January 8, 2022.

New York Giants
On March 17, 2023, Campbell signed a one-year contract with the New York Giants.

References

External links
 Sports-Reference (college)
Indianapolis Colts bio
Ohio State Buckeyes bio

1997 births
Living people
Players of American football from Akron, Ohio
American football wide receivers
St. Vincent–St. Mary High School alumni
Ohio State Buckeyes football players
Indianapolis Colts players
New York Giants players